Pasternik may refer to the following places in Poland:
Pasternik, Lower Silesian Voivodeship (south-west Poland)
Pasternik, Lesser Poland Voivodeship (south Poland)
Pasternik, Masovian Voivodeship (east-central Poland)